The Texas Rangers' 2010 season was the 50th in franchise history. The team, managed by Ron Washington, won their first division title since 1999 and finally won a playoff series, taking longer than any other North American professional sports franchise to accomplish the feat. The club subsequently reached the World Series for the first time in only their fourth playoff appearance. Washington would become only the second manager in franchise history to lead the Rangers to the post season and the first to ever win a post season series. They would win the American League pennant by defeating the defending World Series champions, the New York Yankees, in six games in the ALCS. In the World Series, they lost to the San Francisco Giants in five games.

The 2010 season showed the results of a 5-year plan implemented by GM Jon Daniels in 2007 with the Mark Teixeira trade. The 2007 trade deadline and the amateur draft a month prior would all be key pieces of the successful Rangers season. Dominant rookie of the year closer Neftalí Feliz, defensive All-Star Elvis Andrus, and platoon outfielder David Murphy were all acquired at the trade deadline, while starting pitcher Tommy Hunter, centerfielder Julio Borbon and first baseman Mitch Moreland were each selected in the June 2007 draft. And trades which resulted in Cliff Lee, Bengie Molina, and Jorge Cantú were each completed with a member of the Rangers 2007 draft class being sent in return.

Mirroring the 2009 revelation of Josh Hamilton getting drunk at a bar in Arizona prior to spring training, the Rangers' team members learned that manager Ron Washington failed an MLB drug test prior to the All-Star game in 2009. Instead of dividing the locker room or casting doubt with the players, the teammates stood behind their manager. "I've got Wash's back. He's my manager", third baseman Michael Young told teammates during a meeting where Washington informed the players of his failed drug test.

The pitching staff, looking to be a strength for one of the first times in recent history, would depend on the #3 and 4 starters, C. J. Wilson and Colby Lewis, due to a lack of expected production from Scott Feldman and free agent Rich Harden. Wilson, Lewis, and trade deadline ace Cliff Lee would each finish in the top 20 among American League pitchers in ERA, innings pitched, strikeouts, and WHIP.

A complicated team sale that would end up in bankruptcy court and possibly cost the team president Nolan Ryan and GM Jon Daniels would be an outside threat the team would have to ignore until it was resolved in August.

Thanks to utility infielder Esteban Germán the "claw and antlers" would become an active part of the Rangers in-game celebration. Following a play involving strength a Rangers' player would look to the bench and raise his right arm with fingers outstretched to make a claw. After a play involving speed a player would place his thumbs on each side of his head and outstretch his fingers to make antlers. The fans would embrace the "claws and antlers" and a "claw and antlers" T-shirt, designed by Rangers equipment manager Richard "Hoggy" Price, which would be the top selling MLB T-shirt sold in 2010, selling over 360,000, even though the design was not introduced until after the All-Star game. On the final day of the season fans would participate in a pre-game "claw and antlers" parade.

Offseason
Rudy Jaramillo turned down a 1-year extension and took the hitting coach position with the Chicago Cubs.

The Rangers signed Clint Hurdle for the position of hitting coach.

Iván Rodríguez signed a 2-year deal with the Washington Nationals. The Rangers received a compensation draft pick for Rodriguez who was a type B free agent. The other type B free agent on the Rangers, Marlon Byrd, signed a 3-year deal with the Chicago Cubs, re-joining his hitting instructor Jaramillo.

Omar Vizquel signed with the Chicago White Sox, as well as Andruw Jones. Neither free agent met type A or B status so Texas received no compensation for their departures.

At the winter meetings Jon Daniels made headline moves when Texas traded Kevin Millwood and $3 million to the Baltimore Orioles for pitcher Chris Ray and a PTBNL. The Orioles later selected Ben Snyder in the rule 5 draft from the San Francisco Giants and sent Snyder to the Rangers to complete the trade.

Following the Millwood trade, the Rangers signed Rich Harden to a 1-year deal. The contract includes a mutual 2nd year option. Michael Young told the media his new teammate "... has the best stuff in the league. I didn't say some of the best stuff. I mean the best stuff I've seen." Harden was not offered arbitration by his former club, the Cubs, so Texas did not lose a draft pick to sign the type A free agent.

One trade that was not finalized would have sent Mike Lowell and approximately $9 million in cash to the Rangers and the Red Sox would have received AAA catcher Max Ramírez. The trade was cancelled after a physical discovered an injury to Lowell's thumb that would require surgery.

Vladimir Guerrero signed a 1-year contract with Texas with a mutual 2nd year option. Guerrero would be the DH and was planned to hit 4th behind Josh Hamilton.

The Rangers signed Khalil Greene to a 1-year contract. Greene would have been the utility infielder meeting a need for the team by being able to play 3B and SS, able to back up Michael Young and Elvis Andrus. On January 14 the Rangers and Colby Lewis agreed to a two-year deal. The former Rangers draft pick spent the previous 2 years pitching in Japan where he led the league in strikeouts both seasons and issued only 46 walks in a total of 354 innings pitched. On January 21 it was reported the Rangers designated OF Greg Golson for assignment. Golson was later traded to the New York Yankees for a minor league infielder. On January 25 Joe Inglett was designated for assignment to make room for Lewis on the 40-man roster. Inglett was claimed off waivers by the Milwaukee Brewers.

All-Star 2nd baseman Ian Kinsler had praise for the offseason moves made by the front office. He acknowledged hating to lose Millwood, but recognized how the moves made 2010 the year the Rangers could win the division.

Two final additions to the pitching depth came from an unexpected source. Ranger pitchers Omar Beltré and Alexi Ogando had been banned from receiving US visas after being involved in a marriage-visa scam 5 years ago. Since that time the Rangers, the players, and their agents have been requesting new visas for the players and they were finally approved by February. Both players were listed on the restricted list on the team's 40-man roster, meaning the Rangers retained rights to their MLB services if they ever returned to the United States, but they did not count towards total players allowed on the roster. Both players had to be removed from the restricted list at the completion of spring training.

Financial problems
Rangers owner Tom Hicks' company, Hicks Sports Group (HSG), defaulted on loan payments in 2008 or 2009. Although Hicks had maintained the Rangers were not being affected by the financial transactions, the Rangers had been hampered by the financial troubles of HSG. Most notable was the Rangers inability to sign their 2009 1st round draft pick Matt Purke. After the deadline passed, it was reported the Rangers offered Purke a $4.0 million bonus, two million less than what Purke was reported to be demanding prior to the draft. However, a conflicting report by Randy Galloway said MLB rejected the Rangers contract offer and told Purke that the Rangers would only be allowed to offer a $2.4 million bonus. Hicks later told The Dallas Morning News that the Rangers did offer Purke a $4.0 million offer, and MLB had no influence over the dollar amounts. Ryan would later contradict this claim saying MLB and the commissioner's office had direct dealings with the Rangers in almost all aspects of their financial transactions including approval of bonus money and trade approvals. Ryan and Daniels both said the offer to Purke was "well above slot", but the exact details of the offer were not described, and there may have been other factors as to why Purke did not sign.

By September 2009, speculation had begun to build about MLB forcing the Rangers to shut down front rotation man Kevin Millwood before he surpassed his inning threshold that would vest his 2010 option for $12 million. Hicks did admit that the Rangers had received some advances from MLB, but that the money borrowed would be repaid out of future earnings due the team at the end of the year. In October 2009, MLB executive vice president Rob Manfred sent a letter to then potential buyers Chuck Greenberg and Nolan Ryan informing them the Rangers had been in violation of the collective-bargaining agreement and owed around $40 million. Another major problem for the Rangers following the 2009 season was the refund for prepaid post season tickets. Some fans did not receive refunds from the Rangers until late December, even after the team failed to make the post season.

During the winter meetings, Daniels told the press that the financial problems the Rangers were under was much like operating under a salary cap. These problems were why the Rangers had to trade Millwood before being able to make the Harden signing official. An increase was made to the team budget after the new year when the ownership sale was preliminarily finalized between Hicks and Greenberg/Ryan. Ryan spoke about the financial constraints the team was under after the initial sale agreement was announced.

Hicks told reporters that from April 2007 to March 2009 he added an additional $85 million to HSG. According to Hicks, HSG took on too much debt because the teams were spending more than the budget allowed. However, according to Forbes, the revenue and operating net income of both the Rangers and the Dallas Stars went up from 2006 to 2008. Between the 2006 and 2007 seasons, the debt level for the Texas Rangers increased by approximately $100 million, the same time period when Hicks purchased Liverpool Football Club. From 2007 to 2009, Forbes reported the Rangers and the Stars were the third most leveraged franchises in their respective sports.

Ownership sale
Hicks had been looking for someone to sell partial ownership of the club to since just prior to when the default on the loan was reported. By the 2009 season, Hicks was possibly forced to find a buyer for the team. Three known bids were put in for the ownership of the Rangers. Former agent Dennis Gilbert, Houston businessman Jim Crane, and a partnership of Chuck Greenberg and Nolan Ryan placed bids believed to be around $500 million for the purchase of the team. Hicks offered exclusive negotiation rights to the Greenburg-Ryan group on December 15 with a purchase expected to be complete prior to or following the start of the 2010 season. During the bidding process, it was discovered that Ryan, as president of the club, was not under contract, but working only on a handshake deal with Hicks, and that he would step down from the front office if another bidder were to win. After talks with Gilbert, Ryan later said he would not step down unless asked by the new owner to do so.

In an e-mail dated December 29 sent to HSG attorney Glenn West, MLB attorney Tom Ostertag instructed HSG that "negotiation toward a definitive purchase agreement is to be with the winning bidder only", and no other party is to be involved during the exclusive negotiation process. HSG attorney West then emailed the creditors of HSG on New Year's Eve saying "Basically, the response from the MLB was to prohibit us from negotiating with anyone other than Greenberg. Their intent seems to be to lock us into Greenberg even though Crane now has a clearly superior economic deal – and may always have had based on Greenberg's current position. We need help here. Unless the lenders weigh in, we are going to be stuck negotiating a deal that is clearly worse than Crane's." West also told the creditors that Crane's offer was at least $13 million more and maybe even $20 million more than Greenberg's.

The winter owners' meeting was held prior to the end of the 30-day exclusive negotiation between Hicks and Greenburg. Representing the Rangers at the meeting, Hicks told the media "You're not getting rid of us", indicating the known desire for Hicks to keep his family a minority owner of the Rangers after the sale was completed. The 30-day negotiating period ended on January 14, 2010, with no announcement about the pending sale. On Saturday, January 16, Ryan and Greenberg released a joint statement regarding the sale of the MLB club saying they were "on the verge of an agreement".

We have made extraordinary progress the last couple of weeks and have come too far to walk away now. We are fully committed and prepared to work around the clock if that's what it takes to reach a final agreement. We are at a point where deals get done as long as both parties share a desire to cross the finish line together. There just isn't much left to resolve.

It was reported on January 23 the sale agreement had been completed. Early reports indicated Hicks would remain a minority owner with the club and would serve on the board in a non-voting honorary position. Approval from the executive and ownership committee, the banks who were owed money by HSG, and 75% of MLB owners was still required before the sale could have been finalized. The new company would be called Rangers Baseball Express. Greenberg would serve as CEO and managing partner, and Ray Davis and Bob Simpson would be co-chairmen of the board. A separate company owned by Hicks owns the land. After the land sale was announced, Hicks was sued by a former partner over the land. The former partner claims Hicks never dissolved the partnership that was formed when the two groups were planning the development called Glorypark. Hicks was also sued by an architectural firm, RTKL, and a construction company, Vratsinas, for $6.9 million of unpaid work done over three years ago. Greenberg posted the following on his Facebook page after the original purchase agreement was announced:Tonight was a big night for Nolan Ryan and me as we signed the definitive agreement to purchase the Texas Rangers. Thank you to everyone for your incredible support and encouragement over the last few months. Nolan and I can't wait to get started in our efforts to bring Rangers fans everywhere what you have waited for ...all these years. Thanks again and.... See you at the Ballpark!....... Chuck
A report by Jon Heyman listed the sale price at $570 million. At least one group whose approval was needed, Monarch Alternative Capital, refused to sign off on the sale. Monarch Alternative Capital, which purchased a portion of Hicks Sports Group's debt after HSG defaulted, believed Hicks passed up on a better purchase deal from Jim Crane, who was speculated by the December 29 email to have made a higher offer. The reported gap between creditors demands and payment offered by HSG was $270 million and $300 million and would have been resolved if the amount Hicks was to receive from the land sale was lowered to increase the creditors for the debt. MLB's commissioner, Bud Selig, expressed his interest in the deal being approved by the creditors no later than April 9, 2010, and indicated that MLB could become more directly involved in the sale process.

On May 24, 2010, Hicks announced that HSG had filed for Chapter 11 bankruptcy protection to conclude the sale of the Rangers ballclub from Hicks Sports Group to the Rangers Baseball Express club. In a press conference held at the Ballpark in Arlington, Hicks, Ryan, and Greenberg announced the decision and effects from the action. It was believed by the parties involved, including MLB and Selig, that this action would be the quickest and easiest way to resolve the sale without the approval of HSG creditors, mainly Monarch Capital. The sale presented to the bankruptcy court is "virtually the same" deal that was agreed to by Hicks and Greenberg/Ryan when the two parties agreed to the sale in January 2010.

The bankruptcy was not expected to have any noticeable effect on the day-to-day operations of the Rangers club, all vendors are expected to be paid, and all tickets already sold to the public are to be honored. The sale through the courts was expected to be completed in July prior to the trade deadline and the draft signing deadline. The bankruptcy hearing was first heard in court on May 25. The Rangers claimed there was "no viable option" except approval of the $575 million sale to Ryan and Greenberg, while a group of lenders claimed the club could get a better deal and that the deal presented by the Rangers does not make the most out of the team's assets. The attorney for the Rangers claimed that Hicks funded a $100 million operating loss since acquiring the team in 1999.

After a seven-month process, the Rangers' bankruptcy was finalized by an August 5 auction for ownership of the team by two parties, Rangers Baseball Express led by Ryan and Greenberg, and a partnership of Dallas Mavericks owner Mark Cuban and Crane. The auction was delayed by several hours due to objections raised by Greenberg and Ryan's group questioning the qualification of the Cuban-Crane bid, which was due no later than 8:00 pm on August 3. The auction, which was due to begin at 9:00 am on August 4, did not have its first opening bid determined until 2:50 pm. After no more than three bids by each party, Cuban withdrew from the bidding, and Greenberg and Ryan were declared the winners shortly after midnight. Due to the auction process, the purchase was for only the MLB club and the lease for the ballpark. Almost none of the original side deals with HSG and Hicks, which were rejected by several of the lenders to the Texas Rangers, were included.

Regular season

Team leaders and awards
Pitching

Batting

 AL MVP – Josh Hamilton
 AL Rookie of the Year – Neftalí Feliz
 AL batting champion – Josh Hamilton
 Silver Slugger awards – Josh Hamilton (2), Vlad Guerrero (8)
 All-Star selections – Vladimir Guerrero (9), Josh Hamilton (3), Ian Kinsler (2), Neftalí Feliz (1), Elvis Andrus (1), Cliff Lee (2)
 ALCS MVP – Josh Hamilton
 IBWAA American League Manager of the Year – Ron Washington
 IBWAA AL Executive of the Year – Jon Daniels

Washington would finish in second place for Manager of the Year voting.

Spring training
Khalil Greene did not report to camp at the start of spring training, and was expected to miss significant time with the club. Greene has suffered in the past with anxiety issues which limited his playing time in 2009. Jon Daniels released a statement on Greene's absence from the club.

The Rangers voided Greene's contract in February.

On March 9 the Rangers acquired Edwar Ramírez from the Yankees for cash considerations. Ramirez took the last spot of the 40-man roster that was vacated by Greene's departure. Ramírez would be traded to the Oakland A's 15 days later.

The starting rotation in previous years came down to the last minute to find out who would be the five starters at opening day, often having to get a free agent like Pedro Astacio, who signed in February prior to the 2005 season, or a trade like John Koronka and John Rheinecker, who were acquired at the end of March in 2006.

The 2010 season once again found this question needing to be answered, but unlike previous years, it was due to having too many potential candidates instead of scrambling to find a 5th starter or more. With a rotation starting off with Rich Harden, Scott Feldman, and Colby Lewis there were only two spots left, and with Tommy Hunter coming off a good 2009 showing he had the inside track for the number 4 spot. Remaining were Brandon McCarthy, who had still been unable to make a complete season healthy since 2006; Matt Harrison, who was coming back from surgery; Derek Holland, who started in the bullpen his rookie year of 2009 and finished the season in the rotation; Luis Mendoza, who only made one major league appearance in 2009 but had a strong showing in the winter leagues before spring training; Neftalí Feliz, the  throwing reliever who was expected to be in the bullpen during 2010 if he didn't make the rotation; and C. J. Wilson, who had spent every year with the team in the bullpen since his rookie year in 2005.

Wilson, who has requested a chance to make the starting rotation since 2006, spoke about the upcoming season and his frustrations with the organization not giving him a chance to start prior to 2010.

Wilson's comments were not well received by media or fans of the team. Team president Nolan Ryan stated CJ is a guy "who likes to communicate" and Ron Washington said the team would not address the situation.

This was not the first time comments made by Wilson caused problems for the talented left-hander. Wilson was a regular poster on the website lonestarball.com under the handle blueglovelefty, and in 2005 he stated that the average ballplayer is a douchebag. Wilson was later talked to by several team leaders on the Rangers, including Michael Young and Kevin Millwood. After the incident Wilson deleted his user ID and removed all posts from the website.

On March 17, 2010 Sports Illustrateds Jon Heyman reported Rangers manager Ron Washington failed an MLB drug test in 2009. First-time offending non-playing personnel who fail a drug test or admit to using drugs are not suspended and are subject to counseling and a substance-abuse program. After taking the test Washington called the MLB offices and informed them the test might come back positive. Washington then informed the front office of the Rangers about the test. Washington called a team meeting the morning of the story to inform the players about the failed test.

On March 12 second baseman Ian Kinsler suffered a high ankle sprain. The injury forced the All-Star to start the 2010 season on the disabled list. On March 27 the Rangers traded for Andrés Blanco from the Chicago Cubs for a player to be named later. Blanco will be the utility infielder backing up second base, third base, and shortstop, but he will be the opening day second baseman while Kinsler is on the disabled list. Joaquín Árias will be the utility infielder until Kinsler recovers from injuries.

On April 1 the Rangers claimed Ryan Garko off waivers from the Seattle Mariners.

April

Record (month, season): 11–12

Starting rotation: Scott Feldman, Rich Harden, C. J. Wilson, Colby Lewis, Matt Harrison

The Rangers ended the month with their 4th consecutive April under .500 tied for 3rd place in the division and  a game from 1st.

Scott Feldman was named the opening day starter for the April 5 home opener against the Blue Jays. Feldman was the first non-returning player originally signed/drafted by the Rangers to start opening day since Kenny Rogers in 1995 and the first to start the home opener since RA Dickey in 2004.

After two blown saves in the first week of the season, Frank Francisco was replaced as the closer by Neftalí Feliz.

In a need to increase production from the top of the line-up center fielder Julio Borbon and shortstop Elvis Andrus switched positions in the batting order with Andrus leading off and Borbon hitting 9th.

On April 22 the Rangers sent first baseman Chris Davis to AAA for the second time in two years and called up rookie Justin Smoak to join the team at home against the Detroit Tigers. Smoak would set a franchise record by recording at least one walk in each of his first four major league games.

Right fielder Nelson Cruz, who had led most of the Rangers offensive production in the first month, injured his hamstring and was placed on the DL on April 27. The following day the Rangers optioned catcher Taylor Teagarden to AAA and recalled catcher Max Ramírez and outfielder Craig Gentry. Catcher Jarrod Saltalamacchia was removed from the 15-day DL and optioned to AAA as well.

Ian Kinsler, who missed most of spring training and 29 days in April with a high ankle sprain, made his 2010 season debut against the Seattle Mariners on April 30. To make room for his addition off the 15-day DL second baseman/utility infielder Joaquín Árias was placed on the 15-day DL with a strained back.

May

Record (month, year) 15–12, 26–24

Starting rotation: C. J. Wilson, Rich Harden, Scott Feldman, Colby Lewis, Matt Harrison, Derek Holland

The Rangers spent 26 days of May either tied or in sole possession of 1st place in the West but would lose 6 of their last 7 and end the month in 2nd place behind the Oakland A's.

On May 12, Derek Holland made his first start of the season after being called up from Triple-A Oklahoma. He had been 4–1 with a 0.93 ERA in his time at Triple-A. He pitched 6 innings without allowing a run while striking out 7 and walking 1, picking up his first win of 2010. Matt Harrison was placed on the DL to make room for Holland's call-up.

On May 13, C. J. Wilson became the first pitcher in the franchise's history to begin the season with 7 straight quality starts. In the same game Wilson also set a new franchise record for most consecutive innings pitched without giving up a home run. The Rangers won the game 2–1 in the 12th inning.

On May 14 Nelson Cruz was reactivated from the DL. Ryan Garko was placed on waivers to make room for Cruz. It was the first time in the season the line-up would include both Cruz and Kinsler. The Rangers scored 10 runs in the game against the Toronto Blue Jays but would lose the game.

Nelson Cruz won the honor as player of the week from May 17–23. Cruz pulled his left hamstring on the last at bat in a loss against the Royals on May 26. This was the 2nd time Cruz would go on the DL for a hamstring, the previous was for his right hamstring.

Derek Holland would make 4 starts and 1 relief appearance in May. He suffered from inflammation in his left (throwing) arm on May 30 and left the game during the 2nd inning. The game was being broadcast by ESPN who had a microphone on the home plate umpire. During the injury visit to the mound Holland's voice was heard saying he "couldn't feel the ball" in his hand. He was placed on the DL by the next game.

June

Record (month, year) 21–6, 47–30

Starting rotation: Rich Harden, Scott Feldman, C. J. Wilson, Colby Lewis, Tommy Hunter, Dustin Nippert, Omar Beltré

The Rangers compiled their best monthly record in franchise history high-marked by an 11-game winning streak, the second best in franchise history and highest since 1992. The Rangers spent every day except one in first place for the division and ended the month of June tied with the Yankees for the best record in baseball.

Hamilton and Guerrero's offensive production for the month put both players on the league leader boards with Hamilton and Guerrero tied for 5th in home runs, Hamilton at 4th in batting average followed by Guerrero at 5th, and Hamilton at 4th in hits, Guerrero at 10th, and Young tied for 5th in hits as well. Guerrero finished the month tied for 1st in RBIs at 68. Feliz also finished the month tied for 2nd in saves.

The Rangers called up reliever Pedro Strop after placing Holland on the disabled list. The Rangers recalled pitcher Tommy Hunter to take the 5th spot in the rotation, Strop was reassigned to AAA on June 5. Hunter pitched a complete game in his 2010 debut earning a win against the Tampa Bay Rays on June 5.

Rich Harden was placed on the DL after his June 11 game and replaced on the active roster by Alexi Ogando.

Josh Hamilton and Colby Lewis shared the award for player of the week from June 7–13.

Michael Young became the all-time hit leader in club history on June 16 passing Iván Rodríguez.

Cruz returned from the DL on June 22, Craig Gentry was optioned back to AAA for his return.

Alexi Ogando became the 3rd relief pitcher since 1900 to record a win in each of his first three appearances.

Omar Beltré made his major league debut joining the other formerly exiled Dominican Republican Ogando as teammates again.

Beltre started the last game of the month against the Angels. The Rangers also completed a trade with the San Francisco Giants sending Chris Ray and a PTBNL and receiving Bengie Molina and cash considerations. The trade was not completed before the start of the game, and the Rangers sent Matt Harrison to AAA to make room for Beltre.

Hamilton won player of the month for June.

July

Record (month, year) 14–13, 61–43

Rotation C. J. Wilson, Colby Lewis, Tommy Hunter, Scott Feldman, Omar Beltré, Cliff Lee, Rich Harden

The Rangers lost four games in a row to the Baltimore Orioles going into the All-Star break, however they would win their next four series in a row, including going 4–2 against the Angels and sending them into third place in the division.

The Rangers completed one of their biggest trades in franchise history on July 9 when they sent 2009 first-round draft pick Justin Smoak, minor leaguers Blake Beavan, Josh Lueke, and Matt Lawson to the Seattle Mariners for CY Young-award winner Cliff Lee, and Mark Lowe plus cash. Lee would be the first former Cy Young winner to appear in a Rangers uniform since Gaylord Perry. Chris Davis was recalled from AAA to replace Smoak at first base.

On July 16 against the Red Sox Bengie Molina became the first catcher in MLB history to hit a grand slam and for the cycle in the same game.

Hamilton and Guerrero were voted as starters for the All-Star game and were joined by Kinsler, Andrus, and Feliz. The Rangers also added starting pitcher Lee to the All-Star roster after acquiring him from Seattle.

August

Record (month, year): 13–15, 74–58

Rotation: Cliff Lee, Colby Lewis, C. J. Wilson, Tommy Hunter, Rich Harden, Derek Holland

The Rangers finished the month of August with their worst record of the season going two games under 500. Despite a losing record for the month, the Rangers division lead did not drop below 7 games above the Oakland A's, and the Rangers ended to month 8.5 games ahead of second place.

After making only one start in July, Harden would return to the DL following his August 7 game against Oakland. Harden would make two more starts in the month, throwing only 13 innings and being sent to the bullpen at the end of the month.

August would also be a tough month for the other Rangers ace Cliff Lee, whose record for the month was 1–6. Lee was also accused by ESPN radio host Colin Cowherd claiming people close to Lee said he wanted to sign with the Yankees or another elite team, that Lee didn't care about Texas, and Cowherd also accused Lee of mailing it in against Baltimore on August 21, a game in which Lee gave up 8 runs. After the August 22 game Lee told reporters "It's a lie. Write that. Are you writing? Write that it's a lie. I did not say that and nobody close to me would say that. Either say who the source is or shut up because I am saying it is not true." Following the events in Baltimore Lee would lose his next two games before reporting that he was having muscle pain in his back and would receive an injection.

Oft injured all-stars Cruz and Kinsler spent more time on the DL, Kinsler would not play a single game in the month of August following a late July injury, and Cruz missed a total of fifteen games.

On August 1 former starting catcher Jarrod Saltalamacchia was traded to the Red Sox for Roman Mendez, Chris McGuiness, a player to be named. Outfielder Jeff Francoeur was acquired on August 31 from the Mets for infielder Arias. The Rangers also received cash in the trade.

Rookie Michael Kirkman would make his major league debut on August 21. Ranked as the 15th best prospect by Jamey Newberg prior to the start of the season, Kirkman would pitch 7 innings in the month, striking out eight and giving up no runs in August 5 games.

On August 23, the Rangers nearly combined for a no-hitter against the Minnesota Twins when Rich Harden pitched 6 and 2/3 innings of no-hit ball but was pulled after 111 pitches. Matt Harrison got the last out of the inning, and Darren O'Day pitched a perfect eighth before Neftalí Feliz gave up the first hit of the game with one out in the ninth to Joe Mauer.

September–October

Record (month, year) 16–14, 90–72

Rotation:Tommy Hunter, Derek Holland, Colby Lewis, C. J. Wilson, Scott Feldman, Cliff Lee, Rich Harden

The Rangers' lead peaked at 11 games after clinching the division, setting a new franchise high.

Hamilton injured himself after colliding with the outfield wall making a catch on September 4. it was the second time in consecutive years he would miss significant playing time after crashing into a wall making a catch. X-rays later showed Hamilton had cracked two ribs from the collision. Although the injury itself did not prevent Hamilton from playing, Hamilton would continue to miss time due to pain from the injury and, due to Hamilton's drug past, lasted longer because he is unable to take pain medication. Hamilton would not return until the season series finale against the Angels.

The Rangers would sweep the New York Yankees in a mid-September meeting. It was the first time the Rangers swept the Yankees since 2003, and the first time to do so at home since 1996.

On September 22 Feliz would tie the major league record for saves by a rookie in a single season. Feliz would end the season with 40 saves.

On September 25, the Rangers would clinch the division against the A's. On the same day Young would also set a new record by being the first major leaguer to start over 282 games at second base, short stop, and third base.

Rangers starters Wilson and Lewis would each reach 200 plus innings in their last start of the season. It would be the first time two Rangers starters would reach the mark since 2006. With Lee's total innings pitched, it would be the first time the Rangers had three starters who would reach 200 plus innings since 2002.

Game log

|- style="text-align:center; style="background-color:#bbffbb;"
| 1 || April 5 || Blue Jays || 5–4 || Francisco (1–0) || Frasor (0–1) || — || 50,299 || 1–0 || W1
|- style="text-align:center; style="background-color:#ffbbbb;"
| 2 || April 7 || Blue Jays || 4–7 || Tallet (1–0) || Nippert (0–1) || Frasor (1) || 22,890 || 1–1 || L1
|- style="text-align:center; style="background-color:#ffbbbb;" 
| 3 || April 8 || Blue Jays || 1–3 || Janssen (1–0) || Francisco (1–1) || Frasor (2) || 14,707 || 1–2 || L2
|- style="text-align:center; style="background-color:#bbffbb;"
| 4 || April 9 || Mariners || 6–2 || Lewis (1–0) || Vargas (0–1) || — || 25,271 || 2–2 || W1
|- style="text-align:center; style="background-color:#ffbbbb;"
| 5 || April 10 || Mariners || 3–4 || Lowe (1–1) || Francisco (1–2) || Aardsma (2) || 26,861 || 2–3 || L1
|- style="text-align:center; style="background-color:#bbffbb;"
| 6 || April 11 || Mariners || 9–2 || Feldman (1–0) || Snell (0–1) || — || 26,846 || 3–3 || W1
|- style="text-align:center; style="background-color:#bbffbb;"
| 7 || April 12 || @ Indians || 4–2 (10) || Francisco (2–2) || Wright (0–1) || Feliz (1) || 42,061 || 4–3 || W2
|- style="text-align:center; style="background-color:#bbffbb;"
| 8 || April 14 || @ Indians || 6–2 || Lewis (2–0) || Masterson (0–1) || Feliz (2) || 10,071 || 5–3 || W3
|- style="text-align:center; style="background-color:#ffbbbb;"
| 9 || April 15 || @ Indians || 2–3 || Huff (1–1) || Harrison (0–1) || — || 10,198 || 5–4 || L1
|- style="text-align:center; style="background-color:#ffbbbb;"
| 10 || April 16 || @ Yankees || 1–5 (6) || Sabathia (2–0) || Wilson (0–1) || — || 42,145 || 5–5 || L2
|- style="text-align:center; style="background-color:#ffbbbb;"
| 11 || April 17 || @ Yankees || 3–7 || Burnett (2–0) || Feldman (1–1) || — || 44,963 || 5–6 || L3
|- style="text-align:center; style="background-color:#ffbbbb;"
| 12 || April 18 || @ Yankees || 2–5 || Pettitte (2–0) || Harden (0–1) || Rivera (5) || 44,121 || 5–7 || L4
|- style="text-align:center; style="background-color:#ffbbbb;"
| 13 || April 20 || @ Red Sox || 6–7 || Papelbon (1–1) || Francisco (2–3) || — || 37,614 || 5–8 || L5
|- style="text-align:center; style="background-color:#ffbbbb;"
| 14 || April 21 || @ Red Sox || 7–8 (12) || Okajima (2–1) || Nippert (0–2) || — || 37,518 || 5–9 || L6
|- style="text-align:center; style="background-color:#bbffbb;"
| 15 || April 22 || @ Red Sox || 3–0 || Wilson (1–1) || Buchholz (1–2) || Oliver (1) || 37,417 || 6–9 || W1
|- style="text-align:center; style="background-color:#bbffbb;"
| 16 || April 23 || Tigers || 5–4 || Feliz (1–0) || Ni (0–1) || — || 26,445 || 7–9 || W2
|- style="text-align:center; style="background-color:#ffbbbb;"
| 17 || April 24 || Tigers || 4–8 || Bonine (2–0) || Feldman (1–2) || — || 45,752 || 7–10 || L1
|- style="text-align:center; style="background-color:#bbffbb;"
| 18 || April 25 || Tigers || 8–4 || Lewis (3–0) || Porcello (1–2) || — || 31,211 || 8–10 || W1
|- style="text-align:center; style="background-color:#ffbbbb;"
| 19 || April 26 || Tigers || 6–8 || Coke (3–0) || Feliz (1–1) || Valverde (6) || 16,381 || 8–11 || L1
|- style="text-align:center; style="background-color:#bbffbb;"
| 20 || April 27 || White Sox || 4–2 || Wilson (2–1) || Buehrle (2–3) || Francisco (1) || 14,589 || 9–11 || W1
|- style="text-align:center; style="background-color:#bbffbb;"
| 21 || April 28 || White Sox || 6–5 || Harden (1–1) || Peavy (0–2) || Feliz (3) || 20,432 || 10–11 || W2
|- style="text-align:center; style="background-color:#ffbbbb;"
| 22 || April 29 || White Sox || 5–7 || Floyd (1–2) || O'Day (0–1) || — || 17,778 || 10–12 || L1
|- style="text-align:center; style="background-color:#bbffbb;"
| 23 || April 30 || @ Mariners || 2–0 (12) || Francisco (3–3) || League (3–2) || Feliz (4) || 34,055 || 11–12 || W1
|-

|- style="text-align:center; style="background-color:#bbffbb;"
| 24 || May 1 || @ Mariners || 6–3 || || || || || 12–12 || W2
|- style="text-align:center; style="background-color:#bbffbb;"
| 25 || May 2 || @ Mariners || 3–1 (11) || || || || || 13–12 || W3
|- style="text-align:center; style="background-color:#bbffbb;"
| 26 || May 3 || @ Athletics || 4–2 || || || || || 14–12 || W4
|- style="text-align:center; style="background-color:#ffbbbb;"
| 27 || May 4 || @ Athletics || 6–7 || || || || || 14–13 || L1
|- style="text-align:center; style="background-color:#ffbbbb;"
| 28 || May 5 || @ Athletics || 1–4 || || || || || 14–14 || L2
|- style="text-align:center; style="background-color:#bbffbb;"
| 29 || May 6 || Royals || 13–12 || || || || || 15–14 || W1
|- style="text-align:center; style="background-color:#bbffbb;"
| 30 || May 7 || Royals || 4–1 || || || || || 16–14 || W2
|- style="text-align:center; style="background-color:#bbffbb;"
| 31 || May 8 || Royals || 3–2 || || || || || 17–14 || W3
|- style="text-align:center; style="background-color:#bbffbb;"
| 32 || May 9 || Royals || 6–4 || || || || || 18–14 || W4
|- style="text-align:center; style="background-color:#ffbbbb;"
| 33 || May 11 || Athletics || 6–7 || || || || || 18–15 || L1
|- style="text-align:center; style="background-color:#bbffbb;"
| 34 || May 12 || Athletics || 10–1 || || || || || 19–15 || W1
|- style="text-align:center; style="background-color:#bbffbb;"
| 35 || May 13 || Athletics || 2–1 (12) || || || || || 20–15 || W2
|- style="text-align:center; style="background-color:#ffbbbb;"
| 36 || May 14 || @ Blue Jays || 10–16 || || || || || 20–16 || L1
|- style="text-align:center; style="background-color:#ffbbbb;"
| 37 || May 15 || @ Blue Jays || 0–6 || || || || || 20–17 || L2
|- style="text-align:center; style="background-color:#ffbbbb;"
| 38 || May 16 || @ Blue Jays || 2–5 || || || || || 20–18 || L3
|- style="text-align:center; style="background-color:#bbffbb;"
| 39 || May 17 || Angels || 4–3 || || || || || 21–18 || W1
|- style="text-align:center; style="background-color:#bbffbb;"
| 40 || May 18 || Angels || 8–7 || || || || || 22–18 || W2
|- style="text-align:center; style="background-color:#bbffbb;"
| 41 || May 19 || Orioles || 4–3 || || || || || 23–18 || W3
|- style="text-align:center; style="background-color:#bbffbb;"
| 42 || May 20 || Orioles || 13–7 || || || || || 24–18 || W4
|- style="text-align:center; style="background-color:#bbffbb;"
| 43 || May 21 || Cubs || 2–1 || || || || || 25–18 || W5
|- style="text-align:center; style="background-color:#ffbbbb;"
| 44 || May 22 || Cubs || 4–5 || || || || || 25–19 || L1
|- style="text-align:center; style="background-color:#ffbbbb;"
| 45 || May 23 || Cubs || 4–5 || || || || || 25–20 || L2
|- style="text-align:center; style="background-color:#bbffbb;"
| 46 || May 25 || @ Royals || 8–7 || || || || || 26–20 || W1
|- style="text-align:center; style="background-color:#ffbbbb;"
| 47 || May 26 || @ Royals || 2–5 || || || || || 26–21 || L1
|- style="text-align:center; style="background-color:#ffbbbb;"
| 48 || May 28 || @ Twins || 1–2 || || || || || 26–22 || L2
|- style="text-align:center; style="background-color:#ffbbbb;"
| 49 || May 29 || @ Twins || 3–8 || || || || || 26–23 || L3
|- style="text-align:center; style="background-color:#ffbbbb;"
| 50 || May 30 || @ Twins || 3–6 || || || || || 26–24 || L4
|-

|- style="text-align:center; style="background-color:#bbffbb;"
| 51 || June 1 || @ White Sox || 9–6 || || || || || 27–24 || W1
|- style="text-align:center; style="background-color:#bbffbb;"
| 52 || June 2 || @ White Sox || 9–5 || || || || || 28–24 || W2
|- style="text-align:center; style="background-color:#ffbbbb;"
| 53 || June 3 || @ White Sox || 3–4 || || || || || 28–25 || L1
|- style="text-align:center; style="background-color:#bbffbb;"
| 54 || June 4 || Rays || 9–6 || || || || || 29–25 || W1
|- style="text-align:center; style="background-color:#bbffbb;"
| 55 || June 5 || Rays || 6–1 || || || || || 30–25 || W2
|- style="text-align:center; style="background-color:#ffbbbb;"
| 56 || June 6 || Rays || 5–9 || || || || || 30–26 || L1
|- style="text-align:center; style="background-color:#ffbbbb;"
| 57 || June 7 || Mariners || 2–4 || || || || || 30–27 || L2
|- style="text-align:center; style="background-color:#bbffbb;"
| 58 || June 8 || Mariners || 7–1 || || || || || 31–27 || W1
|- style="text-align:center; style="background-color:#bbffbb;"
| 59 || June 9 || Mariners || 12–2 || || || || || 32–27 || W2
|- style="text-align:center; style="background-color:#bbffbb;"
| 60 || June 10 || Mariners || 12–3 || || || || || 33–27 || W3
|- style="text-align:center; style="background-color:#ffbbbb;"
| 61 || June 11 || @ Brewers || 2–6 || || || || || 33–28 || L1
|- style="text-align:center; style="background-color:#bbffbb;"
| 62 || June 12 || @ Brewers || 4–3 || || || || || 34–28 || W1
|- style="text-align:center; style="background-color:#bbffbb;"
| 63 || June 13 || @ Brewers || 7–2 || || || || || 35–28 || W2
|- style="text-align:center; style="background-color:#bbffbb;"
| 64 || June 15 || @ Marlins || 3–2 || || || || || 36–28 || W3
|- style="text-align:center; style="background-color:#bbffbb;"
| 65 || June 16 || @ Marlins || 6–3 || || || || || 37–28 || W4
|- style="text-align:center; style="background-color:#bbffbb;"
| 66 || June 17 || @ Marlins || 6–4 || || || || || 38–28 || W5
|- style="text-align:center; style="background-color:#bbffbb;"
| 67 || June 18 || @ Astros || 9–3 || || || || || 39–28 || W6
|- style="text-align:center; style="background-color:#bbffbb;"
| 68 || June 19 || @ Astros || 5–1 || || || || || 40–28 || W7
|- style="text-align:center; style="background-color:#bbffbb;"
| 69 || June 20 || @ Astros || 5–4 (10) || || || || || 41–28 || W8
|- style="text-align:center; style="background-color:#bbffbb;"
| 70 || June 22 || Pirates || 6–3 || || || || || 42–28 || W9
|- style="text-align:center; style="background-color:#bbffbb;"
| 71 || June 23 || Pirates || 13–3 || || || || || 43–28 || W10
|- style="text-align:center; style="background-color:#bbffbb;"
| 72 || June 24 || Pirates || 6–5 || || || || || 44–28 || W11
|- style="text-align:center; style="background-color:#ffbbbb;"
| 73 || June 25 || Astros || 4–7 || || || || || 44–29 || L1
|- style="text-align:center; style="background-color:#bbffbb;"
| 74 || June 26 || Astros || 7–2 || || || || || 45–29 || W1
|- style="text-align:center; style="background-color:#bbffbb;"
| 75 || June 27 || Astros || 10–1 || || || || || 46–29 || W2
|- style="text-align:center; style="background-color:#ffbbbb;"
| 76 || June 29 || @ Angels || 5–6 || || || || || 46–30 || L1
|- style="text-align:center; style="background-color:#bbffbb;"
| 77 || June 30 || @ Angels || 6–4 || || || || || 47–30 || W1
|-

|- style="text-align:center; style="background-color:#ffbbbb;"
| 78 || July 1 || @ Angels || 1–2 || || || || || 47–31 || L1
|- style="text-align:center; style="background-color:#ffbbbb;"
| 79 || July 2 || White Sox || 3–5 || || || || || 47–32 || L2
|- style="text-align:center; style="background-color:#bbffbb;"
| 80 || July 3 || White Sox || 3–1 || || || || || 48–32 || W1
|- style="text-align:center; style="background-color:#ffbbbb;"
| 81 || July 4 || White Sox || 3–5 || || || || || 48–33 || L1
|- style="text-align:center; style="background-color:#ffbbbb;"
| 82 || July 5 || Indians || 3–9 || || || || || 48–34 || L2
|- style="text-align:center; style="background-color:#bbffbb;"
| 83 || July 6 || Indians || 12–1 || || || || || 49–34 || W1
|- style="text-align:center; style="background-color:#bbffbb;"
| 84 || July 7 || Indians || 4–3 || || || || || 50–34 || W2
|- style="text-align:center; style="background-color:#ffbbbb;"
| 85 || July 8 || Orioles || 4–6 || || || || || 50–35 || L1
|- style="text-align:center; style="background-color:#ffbbbb;"
| 86 || July 9 || Orioles || 6–7 || || || || || 50–36 || L2
|- style="text-align:center; style="background-color:#ffbbbb;"
| 87 || July 10 || Orioles || 1–6 || || || || || 50–37 || L3
|- style="text-align:center; style="background-color:#ffbbbb;"
| 88 || July 11 || Orioles || 1–4 || || || || || 50–38 || L4
|- style="text-align:center; style="background-color:#bbffbb;"
| 89 || July 15 || @ Red Sox || 7–2 || || || || || 51–38 || W1
|- style="text-align:center; style="background-color:#bbffbb;"
| 90 || July 16 || @ Red Sox || 8–4 || || || || || 52–38 || W2
|- style="text-align:center; style="background-color:#ffbbbb;"
| 91 || July 17 || @ Red Sox || 2–3 (11) || || || || || 52–39 || L1
|- style="text-align:center; style="background-color:#bbffbb;"
| 92 || July 18 || @ Red Sox || 4–2 || || || || || 53–39 || W1
|- style="text-align:center; style="background-color:#bbffbb;"
| 93 || July 19 || @ Tigers || 8–6 (14) || || || || || 54–39 || W2
|- style="text-align:center; style="background-color:#bbffbb;"
| 94 || July 20 || @ Tigers || 8–0 || || || || || 55–39 || W3
|- style="text-align:center; style="background-color:#ffbbbb;"
| 95 || July 21 || @ Tigers || 1–4 || || || || || 55–40 || L1
|- style="text-align:center; style="background-color:#bbffbb;"
| 96 || July 22 || Angels || 3–2 || || || || || 56–40 || W1
|- style="text-align:center; style="background-color:#bbffbb;"
| 97 || July 23 || Angels || 1–0 || || || || || 57–40 || W2
|- style="text-align:center; style="background-color:#ffbbbb;"
| 98 || July 24 || Angels || 2–6 || || || || || 57–41 || L1
|- style="text-align:center; style="background-color:#bbffbb;"
| 99 || July 25 || Angels || 6–4 || || || || || 58–41 || W1
|- style="text-align:center; style="background-color:#bbffbb;"
| 100 || July 27 || Athletics || 3–1 (10) || || || || || 59–41 || W2
|- style="text-align:center; style="background-color:#ffbbbb;"
| 101 || July 28 || Athletics || 1–3 || || || || || 59–42 || L1
|- style="text-align:center; style="background-color:#bbffbb;"
| 102 || July 29 || Athletics || 7–4 || || || || || 60–42 || W1
|- style="text-align:center; style="background-color:#ffbbbb;"
| 103 || July 30 || @ Angels || 7–9 || || || || || 60–43 || L1
|- style="text-align:center; style="background-color:#bbffbb;"
| 104 || July 31 || @ Angels || 2–1 || || || || || 61–43 || W1
|-

|- style="text-align:center; style="background-color:#ffbbbb;"
| 105 || August 1 || @ Angels || 1–4 || || || || || 61–44 || L1
|- style="text-align:center; style="background-color:#ffbbbb;"
| 106 || August 3 || @ Mariners || 2–3 || || || || || 61–45 || L2
|- style="text-align:center; style="background-color:#bbffbb;"
| 107 || August 4 || @ Mariners || 11–6 || || || || || 62–45 || W1
|- style="text-align:center; style="background-color:#bbffbb;"
| 108 || August 5 || @ Mariners || 6–0 || || || || || 63–45 || W2
|- style="text-align:center; style="background-color:#bbffbb;"
| 109 || August 6 || @ Athletics || 5–1 || || || || || 64–45 || W3
|- style="text-align:center; style="background-color:#ffbbbb;"
| 110 || August 7 || @ Athletics || 2–6 || || || || || 64–46 || L1
|- style="text-align:center; style="background-color:#ffbbbb;"
| 111 || August 8 || @ Athletics || 2–3 || || || || || 64–47 || L2
|- style="text-align:center; style="background-color:#bbffbb;"
| 112 || August 10 || Yankees || 4–3 (10) || || || || || 65–47 || W1
|- style="text-align:center; style="background-color:#ffbbbb;"
| 113 || August 11 || Yankees || 6–7 || || || || || 65–48 || L1
|- style="text-align:center; style="background-color:#bbffbb;"
| 114 || August 13 || Red Sox || 10–9 (11) || || || || || 66–48 || W1
|- style="text-align:center; style="background-color:#ffbbbb;"
| 115 || August 14 || Red Sox || 1–3 || || || || || 66–49 || L1
|- style="text-align:center; style="background-color:#bbffbb;"
| 116 || August 15 || Red Sox || 7–3 || || || || || 67–49 || W1
|- style="text-align:center; style="background-color:#ffbbbb;"
| 117 || August 16 || @ Rays || 4–6 || || || || || 67–50 || L1
|- style="text-align:center; style="background-color:#ffbbbb;"
| 118 || August 17 || @ Rays || 1–10 || || || || || 67–51 || L2
|- style="text-align:center; style="background-color:#ffbbbb;"
| 119 || August 18 || @ Rays || 6–8 || || || || || 67–52 || L3
|- style="text-align:center; style="background-color:#ffbbbb;"
| 120 || August 19 || @ Orioles || 0–4 || || || || || 67–53 || L4
|- style="text-align:center; style="background-color:#bbffbb;"
| 121 || August 20 || @ Orioles || 2–0 || || || || || 68–53 || W1
|- style="text-align:center; style="background-color:#ffbbbb;"
| 122 || August 21 || @ Orioles || 6–8 || || || || || 68–54 || L1
|- style="text-align:center; style="background-color:#bbffbb;"
| 123 || August 22 || @ Orioles || 6–4 || || || || || 69–54 || W1
|- style="text-align:center; style="background-color:#bbffbb;"
| 124 || August 23 || Twins || 4–0 || || || || || 70–54 || W2
|- style="text-align:center; style="background-color:#bbffbb;"
| 125 || August 24 || Twins || 4–3 || || || || || 71–54 || W3
|- style="text-align:center; style="background-color:#bbffbb;"
| 126 || August 25 || Twins || 4–3 || || || || || 72–54 || W4
|- style="text-align:center; style="background-color:#ffbbbb;"
| 127 || August 26 || Twins || 4–6 || || || || || 72–55 || L1
|- style="text-align:center; style="background-color:#bbffbb;"
| 128 || August 27 || Athletics || 7–3 || || || || || 73–55 || W1
|- style="text-align:center; style="background-color:#ffbbbb;"
| 129 || August 28 || Athletics || 0–5 || || || || || 73–56 || L1
|- style="text-align:center; style="background-color:#ffbbbb;"
| 130 || August 29 || Athletics || 2–8 || || || || || 73–57 || L2
|- style="text-align:center; style="background-color:#bbffbb;"
| 131 || August 30 || @ Royals || 3–0 || || || || || 74–57 || W1
|- style="text-align:center; style="background-color:#ffbbbb;"
| 132 || August 31 || @ Royals || 9–10 || || || || || 74–58 || L1
|-

|- style="text-align:center; style="background-color:#bbffbb;"
| 133 || September 1 || @ Royals || 4–3 || || || || || 75–58 || W1
|- style="text-align:center; style="background-color:#ffbbbb;"
| 134 || September 3 || @ Twins || 3–4 || || || || || 75–59 || L1
|- style="text-align:center; style="background-color:#ffbbbb;"
| 135 || September 4 || @ Twins || 4–12 || || || || || 75–60 || L2
|- style="text-align:center; style="background-color:#ffbbbb;"
| 136 || September 5 || @ Twins || 5–6 || || || || || 75–61 || L3
|- style="text-align:center; style="background-color:#ffbbbb;"
| 137 || September 6 || @ Blue Jays || 2–7 || || || || || 75–62 || L4
|- style="text-align:center; style="background-color:#ffbbbb;"
| 138 || September 7 || @ Blue Jays || 5–8 || || || || || 75–63 || L5
|- style="text-align:center; style="background-color:#bbffbb;"
| 139 || September 8 || @ Blue Jays || 8–1 || || || || || 76–63 || W1
|- style="text-align:center; style="background-color:#bbffbb;"
| 140 || September 9 || @ Blue Jays || 4–2 || || || || || 77–63 || W2
|- style="text-align:center; style="background-color:#bbffbb;"
| 141 || September 10 || Yankees || 6–5 (13) || || || || || 78–63 || W3
|- style="text-align:center; style="background-color:#bbffbb;"
| 142 || September 11 || Yankees || 7–6 || || || || || 79–63 || W4
|- style="text-align:center; style="background-color:#bbffbb;"
| 143 || September 12 || Yankees || 4–1 || || || || || 80–63 || W5
|- style="text-align:center; style="background-color:#bbffbb;"
| 144 || September 14 || Tigers || 11–4 || || || || || 81–63 || W6
|- style="text-align:center; style="background-color:#bbffbb;"
| 145 || September 15 || Tigers || 11–7 || || || || || 82–63 || W7
|- style="text-align:center; style="background-color:#ffbbbb;"
| 146 || September 17 || @ Mariners || 1–2 || || || || || 82–64 || L1
|- style="text-align:center; style="background-color:#bbffbb;"
| 147 || September 18 || @ Mariners || 6–1 || || || || || 83–64 || W1
|- style="text-align:center; style="background-color:#ffbbbb;"
| 148 || September 19 || @ Mariners || 1–2 || || || || || 83–65 || L1
|- style="text-align:center; style="background-color:#ffbbbb;"
| 149 || September 20 || @ Angels || 4–7 || || || || || 83–66 || L2
|- style="text-align:center; style="background-color:#ffbbbb;"
| 150 || September 21 || @ Angels || 0–2 || || || || || 83–67 || L3
|- style="text-align:center; style="background-color:#bbffbb;"
| 151 || September 22 || @ Angels || 2–1 (12) || || || || || 84–67 || W1
|- style="text-align:center; style="background-color:#ffbbbb;"
| 152 || September 23 || @ Athletics || 0–5 || || || || || 84–68 || L1
|- style="text-align:center; style="background-color:#bbffbb;"
| 153 || September 24 || @ Athletics || 10–3 || || || || || 85–68 || W1
|- style="text-align:center; style="background-color:#bbffbb;"
| 154 || September 25 || @ Athletics || 4–3 || || || || || 86–68 || W2
|- style="text-align:center; style="background-color:#bbffbb;"
| 155 || September 26 || @ Athletics || 16–9 || || || || || 87–68 || W3
|- style="text-align:center; style="background-color:#ffbbbb;"
| 156 || September 27 || Mariners || 5–7 || || || || || 87–69 || L1
|- style="text-align:center; style="background-color:#ffbbbb;"
| 157 || September 28 || Mariners || 1–3 || || || || || 87–70 || L2
|- style="text-align:center; style="background-color:#bbffbb;"
| 158 || September 29 || Mariners || 6–5 || || || || || 88–70 || W1
|- style="text-align:center; style="background-color:#bbffbb;"
| 159 || September 30 || Angels || 3–2 || || || || || 89–70 || W2
|-

|- style="text-align:center; style="background-color:#ffbbbb;"
| 160 || October 1 || Angels || 4–5 (11) || || || || || 89–71 || L1
|- style="text-align:center; style="background-color:#bbffbb;"
| 161 || October 2 || Angels || 6–2 || || || || || 90–71 || W1
|- style="text-align:center; style="background-color:#ffbbbb;"
| 162 || October 3 || Angels || 2–6 || || || || || 90–72 || L1
|-

Player stats

Batting
Note: G = Games played; AB = At bats; R = Runs; H = Hits; 2B = Doubles; 3B = Triples; HR = Home runs; RBI = Runs batted in; SB = Stolen bases: BB = Walks; AVG = Batting average; SLG = Slugging average

Source:

Pitching
Note: W = Wins; L = Losses; ERA = Earned run average; G = Games pitched; GS = Games started; SV = Saves; IP = Innings pitched; H = Hits allowed; R = Runs allowed; ER = Earned runs allowed; BB = Walks allowed; SO = Strikeouts

Source:

Postseason
The Texas Rangers, at 90–72, advanced to the postseason for the fourth time in franchise history, and the first time since 1999. Their opponent in the ALDS were the Tampa Bay Rays. Their opponent for the ALCS were the New York Yankees

ALDS vs. Rays

The Rangers won the ALDS in 5 games versus the Rays. Each team won only away games, and it was the first time a divisional round has ever been won by only the away teams. The game 1 win was Lee's first win in Tampa Bay of the year, it was also the Rangers' first win in Tampa as well.

Prior to game 2 ESPN's Tim Kurkjian said C. J. Wilson was the best #2 pitcher in the American League playoffs. Game 2 would not be without controversy as Michael Young appeared to swing at a two-strike pitch. The third-base umpire ruled Young had checked his swing, and Young would hit the next pitch for a three-run home run.

Prior to game 5 in Tampa Bay the last time a runner scored from second base on an infield grounder was 1970. The Rangers would score from second on infield grounders twice in the game.

After Lee's two starts there would only be 8 games in playoff history when a pitcher would have 10+ strikeouts and no walks. Lee has pitched 4 of those games. Lee also tied the Division Series record of 21 strikeouts set by Kevin Brown in 1998 with the San Diego Padres. Lee's 16 innings without a walk set a new ALDS record.

Cruz and Kinsler would also hit 3 home runs each in the series. The last time two teammates each hit 3 or more home runs in the same playoff series was in 1928 when Babe Ruth and Lou Gehrig did it for the New York Yankees.

ALCS vs. Yankees

The Rangers would win the ALCS in 6 games after splitting the first two games in Texas and winning two in New York. Colby Lewis would not only be the first Rangers pitcher to win a home playoff game, doing so in game 2, but would also win the second home playoff victory in franchise history in the same series, clinching the American League championship in Game 6. The Rangers advanced to the World Series for the first time.

The Rangers' first three batters of the series would each get on base and score after Josh Hamilton hit a three-run home run in the bottom of the first inning of game 1. It was only the second time in playoff history a team had done so. The Rangers game 2 win broke an 0–10 record versus the Yankees in playoff games. Prior to his one walk in game 3, Lee amassed 30 post-season strikeouts between walks, an MLB record. Lee is also the first pitcher to get 10+ strikeouts three times in the same post-season.

2010 World Series

While the Rangers starting pitching would continue to be strong in the World Series, giving up only 33 runs in  innings, the Rangers offense would only record 29 total hits in the 5 games. The Giants would score as many runs as the Rangers had hits in the series. The Rangers would also be shut out by the Giants in two of the games. It was the first time a team had been shut out in two world series games since the 1966 series.

A bullpen meltdown in game 2 culminated by 4 walks in a row allowed the Giants to take a commanding lead scoring 7 runs in the 8th innings.

The lone victory for the Rangers would be game 3. Colby Lewis would win his third home playoff victory after rookie first baseman Mitch Moreland took advantage of a 9-pitch at-bat with a 3-run home run. Moreland would be the only bright spot in the Rangers offense against the Giants finishing with a .462 batting average. No other Rangers batter would get 6 hits in the series, and the second best would need 7 more at bats to get to 5 hits. Neftalí Feliz would get the save. It was Feliz' only save opportunity in the entire postseason.

The bullpen troubles would continue to grow worse for the Rangers when in game 4 setup reliever Alexi Ogando would leave the game with a strain.

Farm system

Among baseball publications the top four Ranger prospects are all agreed upon, with Neftalí Feliz most often being #1 and Tanner Scheppers being number #4 and all four were consistently ranked as top 100 or top 50 prospects.
 Neftalí Feliz
 Justin Smoak
 Martín Pérez
 Tanner Scheppers

Jamey Newberg and Baseball America had Smoak ahead of Perez. Baseball Time in Arlington listed Perez ahead of Smoak.

Keith Law, who ranked the Rangers as having the number 1 farm system listed them in his top 100 with Perez being the highest of the four coming in at #7 overall in baseball.

MLB.com's top 50 players also included the Rangers prospects. Feliz and Smoak were both in the top 10 on this list.

MLB Fanhouse ranked the Rangers system number 2 and listed them in their top 100 as well.

Baseball America had the Rangers farm system ranked the second-best, behind Tampa Bay. Two of their main writers, John Manuel and Jim Callis, have stated they consider the Rangers to be the number 1 farm system as recently as December, 2009.

The Rangers minor league affiliates set a club record by sending six of the minor league teams to their respective playoffs.

MLB draft and international free agents
On January 18 it was reported the Rangers signed Jorge Alfaro, a 16-year-old catcher from Colombia, for $1.3 million. The 6' 1"  right-hander is a power hitter with a strong arm. The Rangers also signed Australian-born catcher Guy Edmonds for $150,000 in February.

The Rangers signed Dominican Republic short stop Luis Marte for 215,000 in November.

Draft:
The Rangers accumulated 4 first round and supplemental round picks for the 2010 draft; the pick at 15, awarded for their failure to sign Matt Purke from the 2009 pick, their natural pick at 22, and picks 45 and 49 from the loss of free agents Iván Rodríguez and Marlon Byrd respectively. This was the most 1st round picks the Rangers had acquired since 2007 when the Rangers had 5 1st round picks.

Speculation prior to the draft predicted the Rangers would acquire a 'safe' pick at 15 because if they failed to sign the pick the Rangers would receive no further compensation for the pick. It was also speculated the Rangers would select players expected to be signed close to slot due to financial difficulties with the bankruptcy process and being required to follow the budget the team had set out prior to the season and approved by MLB.

Jake Skole did not make the top 200 prospects in Baseball America's draft preview and an ankle injury at the start of his senior year of high school kept him out of action until the playoffs. However his performance in the playoffs helped increase his draft position getting two hits off Kaleb Cowart who was selected by the division rival Angels with the 18th pick. Some reviews see the pick as a stretch while others see the pick as a good selection of raw talent and believe Skole would have been picked a few selections later in the 1st round.

Roster

Season standings

Record vs. opponents

Game log 
2010 Texas Rangers Schedule

Farm system

References

External links

 2010 Texas Rangers season at Official Site 
 2010 Texas Rangers season at Baseball Reference
 Dallas Morning News MLB
 Fort Worth Star Telegram MLB
 TR Sullivan MLB.com
 The Newberg Report by Jamey Newberg
 Lone Star Ball:An SB Nation Community "Smoak 'em if you got 'em"
 Baseball Time in Arlington
 Podcast Time in Arlington
 MLB Trade Rumors, Texas Rangers

Texas Rangers seasons
Texas Rangers
American League West champion seasons
American League champion seasons
Range